Kevin Lee Pritchard (born July 18, 1967) is an American basketball executive, and a former player and coach, who is currently the president of basketball operations for the Indiana Pacers. Pritchard played 4 seasons in the NBA as a player, and was also the general manager of the Portland Trail Blazers, and the Indiana Pacers.

College career
Pritchard played college basketball for the University of Kansas, where, as a sophomore, he was the starting point guard on the Jayhawks team that defeated the Oklahoma Sooners for the 1988 NCAA Division I men's basketball championship.

Professional career
Pritchard was drafted by the Golden State Warriors of the National Basketball Association as the 34th overall pick in 1990. He had a six-year NBA career spanning five teams: the Warriors, the Boston Celtics, the Philadelphia 76ers, the Miami Heat, and the Washington Bullets. He was first player signed to the Vancouver Grizzlies in 1995, although he was released before getting an opportunity to play a game for them. Pritchard's playing career also included a stint with Caceres C.B. in Spain, Pfizer Reggio Calabria in Italy in 1993-1994, and Bayer Leverkusen in Germany 1996-1997. He retired from playing in 1998.

Executive career

Early coaching and management career
After a year working outside of basketball, Pritchard became the coach and general manager of the Kansas City Knights of the ABA, which he led to a championship in 2002. Later, he was hired by San Antonio Spurs general manager R. C. Buford to be a scout in the Spurs' organization, and two years later was hired by the Portland Trail Blazers as director of player personnel.

In 2005, when the Trail Blazers fired head coach Maurice Cheeks, they named Pritchard as his interim replacement.

Portland Trail Blazers
In the 2006 off-season, the team fired John Nash, giving Steve Patterson the dual role of general manager and president, while Pritchard was promoted to assistant general manager. In 2007, Patterson resigned, and on March 29, Pritchard was named as the team's general manager.

In December 2008, the Blazers attempted to block other NBA teams from signing Darius Miles solely for the purpose of negatively impacting the Blazers' salary cap situation.  Miles ended up signing with the Memphis Grizzlies.

In the summer of 2009, the Blazers added to their core of young talent by signing veterans Andre Miller and Juwan Howard to free agent contracts. The 2009-10 Blazers suffered a historic level of injuries to key players, yet the team still won 50 games and returned to the playoffs.

Pritchard was relieved of his general manager duties on June 24, 2010. About one hour before the 2010 NBA Draft, Kevin Pritchard was notified by Paul Allen that he had been fired, but wanted to make it clear that he needed to stay for the draft.  Pritchard made a trade and two draft selections, which satisfied Trail Blazer team officials.

Many people expected the release of Pritchard to take place, as they felt the firing of Tom Penn, who was the assistant general manager, was a "drive-by" warning for Pritchard.

Joe Freeman, of The Oregonian newspaper, broke this story early in the four o'clock hour of draft day to "Trail Blazers Courtside", an official Trail Blazer show offering live draft day coverage. It was reported that the Trail Blazers officials told the show's hosts to stop talking about Pritchard immediately. Allen's plan was to announce the firing the next day, but word got to the media and the Blazers were forced to address the situation.

In a press conference after, team President Larry Miller fielded all questions. No reasons were given as to why Pritchard was fired.

Pritchard authored an open letter to Blazers' fans in which he thanked Paul Allen and the Blazers for the opportunity to help turn around the team.

Indiana Pacers
In July 2011, Pritchard joined the Indiana Pacers to become their director of player personnel. Later on, he was promoted to general manager in June 2012 to replace David Morway. On May 1, 2017, Pritchard took over the role of president of basketball operations, while retaining his general manager duties, when Larry Bird resigned.

Head coaching record

|- 
| style="text-align:left;"|Portland
| style="text-align:left;"|
|27||5||22|||| style="text-align:center;"|4th in Northwest||—||—||—||—
| style="text-align:center;"|Missed Playoffs
|- class="sortbottom"
| style="text-align:left;"|Career
| ||27||5||22|||| ||—||—||—||—

References

External links
 NBA stats @ basketballreference.com

1967 births
Living people
American Basketball Association (2000–present) coaches
American expatriate basketball people in Germany
American expatriate basketball people in Italy
American expatriate basketball people in Spain
American men's basketball coaches
American men's basketball players
Basketball players from Indiana
Bayer Giants Leverkusen players
Boston Celtics players
Golden State Warriors draft picks
Golden State Warriors players
Indiana Pacers executives
Kansas Jayhawks men's basketball players
Liga ACB players
Miami Heat players
National Basketball Association general managers
Philadelphia 76ers players
Point guards
Portland Trail Blazers executives
Portland Trail Blazers head coaches
Quad City Thunder players
Sportspeople from Bloomington, Indiana
Viola Reggio Calabria players
Washington Bullets players